The 2018–19 División de Honor de Hockey Hierba was the 53rd season of the División de Honor de Hockey Hierba, the highest field hockey league in Spain. The season began on 9 September 2018 and it concluded with the championship final on 19 May 2019 in Terrassa.

Real Club de Polo were the defending champions, while Linia 22 and Jolaseta entered as the promoted teams from the 2017–18 División de Honor Masculina B. Club Egara won their 15th title by defeating Real Club de Polo 2–1 in the final.

Teams

Number of teams by autonomous community

Regular season

League table

Results

Play-offs
The semi-finals and final were played on 18 and 19 May 2019 and hosted by Club Egara in Terrassa.

Bracket

Quarter-finals
The quarter-finals were played over two legs, both games being played at the best-placed team's pitch.

|}

Real Club de Polo won 6–2 on aggregate.

Atlètic Terrassa won 11–4 on aggregate.

Club Egara won 4–1 on aggregate.

Club de Campo won 7–6 on aggregate.

Semi-finals

Final

Relegation play-off

Jolaseta won series 2–0 and therefore both clubs remain in their respective leagues.

See also
2018–19 Copa del Rey de Hockey Hierba

References

External links
Official page

División de Honor de Hockey Hierba
Spain
field hockey
field hockey